is a Quasi-National Park in southern Nagano Prefecture, Japan. The Park's central feature is the Central Alps. Three separate areas of the park span the borders of thirteen municipalities: Achi, Agematsu, Iida, Iijima, Ina, Kiso, Komagane, Matsukawa, Miyada, Nagiso, Ōkuwa, Shiojiri, and Takamori.

See also
 National Parks of Japan
 Japanese Alps

References

External links
  Map of Chūō Alps Quasi-National Park

Parks and gardens in Nagano Prefecture
Protected areas established in 2020
2020 establishments in Japan
Achi, Nagano
Agematsu, Nagano
Iida, Nagano
Iijima, Nagano
Ina, Nagano
Kiso, Nagano (town)
Komagane, Nagano
Matsukawa, Nagano (Shimoina)
Miyada, Nagano
Nagiso, Nagano
Ōkuwa, Nagano
Shiojiri, Nagano
Takamori, Nagano